Mate. Feed. Kill. Repeat. is the first album recorded by American heavy metal band Slipknot, and their only release with original lead vocalist Anders Colsefni. The album was limited to 1,000 copies, with distribution beginning on October 31, 1996. The band sold the last 386 units through -ismist Recordings in 1997. The album has become sought after by fans since Slipknot's rise to fame, and original copies have sold for up to $1,000.

Despite originally being deemed Slipknot's debut album, Mate. Feed. Kill. Repeat. was later considered a demo by the band, who have included the majority of its songs on subsequent releases, albeit usually in radically altered forms. The record was recorded in Des Moines, Iowa over a period of four months and features many musical influences including funk, jazz, and disco which are not apparent in later material. Many of the lyrics and the album's title are inspired by the role-playing game Werewolf: The Apocalypse. According to Allmusic, the songs contain a stronger "emphasis on non-traditional songwriting" and melodic themes than the band's later material.

Recording and production
In late 1995, Slipknot and producer Sean McMahon entered SR Audio, a studio in the band's hometown of Des Moines, Iowa to work on what they intended to be their debut album. Retrospectively, McMahon said that the band was "driven" because they spent the majority of their time in the studio for the four months it took to produce the album. Slipknot self-financed the production, which came to an estimated $40,000. The band expressed how much of a learning process this time was, being the first time they had recorded their music, specifically the challenge of capturing additional percussion elements.

The band aimed for a tribal sound, but encountered problems including minuscule timing errors. However, during this period, Slipknot refined their percussive sound by experimenting with erecting walls to isolate the drums and rearranging parts. In February 1996, during the mixing process, guitarist Donnie Steele decided to leave the band for religious reasons and as a result, Craig Jones joined the band to fill the spot. However, the band realized that they were incorporating too many media samples on their recordings and could not replicate these sounds live. To solve this problem, Jones abandoned his position on guitar and moved to his current position as a sampler—at that point Mick Thomson stepped in to join as guitarist. Originally, the band had planned to include twelve tracks on the CD, two of which – "Fur" and "Part of Me" – already appeared on their first demo in 1995. In the end, Mate. Feed. Kill. Repeat. was released with only eight tracks. The band threw a release party at The Safari, a club in Des Moines where the band played many of their earliest gigs.

Musical and lyrical themes
Mate. Feed. Kill. Repeat. is a mix of genres centered on death metal and nu metal; it is the band's most experimental release and differs significantly from the heavier style for which the band became known. One of the band's initial aims was to mix many genres of music to achieve their own style; an early incarnation of the band was called "Meld" based upon this. However, tracks such as "Slipknot", "Some Feel" and "Only One" feature a heavy metal influence, specifically in the guitars. Tracks such as "Tattered & Torn", "Killers Are Quiet" and "Gently" also include the slow, cerebral angst buildup style that the band retained in some of their more recent work. The album implements elements of jazz and funk, although "Confessions" is the only track on the album led by these styles. "Do Nothing/Bitchslap" could be considered the album's most complex song, combining both of these styles and even elements of disco.

The album title and the majority of the lyrics are references to the role-playing game Werewolf: The Apocalypse. Vocalist Anders Colsefni and percussionist Shawn Crahan shared a mutual interest in the game, which largely influenced the band. Colsefni said: "The attraction was being able to play a different person", declaring that this was the essence of Slipknot.

Artwork 
The artwork shows a metal cage, made by Shawn Crahan, with Joey Jordison sitting inside of it. This cage was named "Patiently Awaiting the Jigsaw Flesh" by Joey Jordison, as whenever they carried the cage, someone got cut brutally. It was also known as the "Death Cage" and was a part of the stage show during the release party of the album. Willing "victims"  sat inside of it while the band played.

Legacy

The original pressing of the album was limited to 1000 copies. Since the band's rise to fame in 1999, it has been a sought-after rarity for Slipknot fans. Upon its initial release, the band distributed the album independently, handing them out to fans, radio stations, and record labels. On June 13, 1997, -ismist Recordings took over the distribution of the remaining 386 copies of the album. These original pressings have since grown in value considerably. Due to the large amount of interest in the album and the low numbers of originals, there have been many bootlegged versions of the album sold including CD, MP3 and even vinyl. 

The barcode of the original CD is the number "742617000027", which later went on to become the name for the opening track of their first official release, Slipknot.

Track listing

Personnel

Slipknot

 Joey Jordison – drums
 Paul Gray – bass, backing vocals
 Shawn "Clown" Crahan – percussion, backing vocals
 Anders Colsefni – lead vocals, additional percussion
 Donnie Steele – lead guitar
 Josh "Gnar" Brainard – rhythm guitar, backing vocals

References

Works cited

 

1996 albums
Slipknot (band) albums
-ismist Recordings albums
Demo albums
Death metal albums by American artists